Alexander Sanderson (born 7 October 1979 in Chester) is an English former rugby union footballer who played in the back row during the 1990s and 2000s for Saracens and Sale Sharks. He is the brother of Pat Sanderson who also played rugby for Littleborough RUFC. He is currently Director of Rugby at Sale Sharks.

His rugby career blossomed under coach Brian Gornall at Kirkham Grammar School. His first Sale coach, John Mitchell, also had a great influence on him as did Steve Diamond and Jim Mallinder, both of whom he played alongside when he broke into the first team.

He scored a try on his England debut after coming on as a replacement against Romania in November 2001, having captained the England midweek side in North America soon after being selected for the England XV against the Barbarians at Twickenham. He made his Six Nations debut as a replacement against Italy in March 2003 and was part of the wider 43-man squad for the World Cup, playing in the pre-World Cup warm-up matches against Wales and France in Marseille.

He was forced to retire from rugby in 2005 due to a back injury.

After a 17-year association with Saracens it was announced in January 2021 that Sanderson had been appointed Sale Sharks' Director of Rugby.

International tries

References

External links
Information for Alex Sanderson
Scrum.com player statistics

1979 births
Living people
England international rugby union players
English rugby union players
People educated at Kirkham Grammar School
Rugby union flankers
Rugby union players from Chester
Sale Sharks players
Saracens F.C. players